Winton Woods City School District is a city school district in northern Hamilton County, Ohio, United States. Winton Woods serves students living in Forest Park, Greenhills, and Springfield Township.

The school district was renamed Winton Woods when Greenhills and Forest Park High Schools were merged in 1991 for the 1991–92 school year. The district's general offices are located at 1215 W. Kemper Rd. in Forest Park, next to the high school.

The current superintendent is Anthony G. Smith.

About
In 2014, the district and 5 other Ohio school districts were involved in a scandal over academic data, which they had altered to improve performance ratings. Their performance rating was later revised from an 89.6 to an 89.4.

The district has recently switched to the New Tech Network.

Schools within the district 
Academy of Global Studies - Grades 9-12
Winton Woods North Campus - Grades 7-12
 Winton Woods South Campus - Grades 1-6
 Winton Woods Early Childhood Central Campus - Grades Pre-K to K

Neighboring districts 
East (Forest Park) - Princeton City School District 
West (Forest Park) - Northwest Local School District
North (Forest Park ) - Fairfield City School District
South (Greenhills) - Finneytown Local School District
South (Forest Park) - Mt Healthy City Schools

Closed schools/Buildings no longer district schools 
 Damon Road Elementary School (Greenhills)
 Forest View Elementary School (Forest Park in 'H' section)
 Cameron Park Elementary School (Forest Park in 'C' section)
 Greenhills Middle School (Greenhills, located directly behind Greenhills Shopping Center)

References

External links 
 Winton Woods City School District

School districts in Ohio
Education in Hamilton County, Ohio
1905 establishments in Ohio
School districts established in 1905